Industrialised building system (IBS) is a term used in Malaysia for a technique of construction  where by components are manufactured in a controlled environment, either at site or off site, placed and assembled into construction works. Worldwide, IBS is also known as Pre-fabricated/Pre-fab Construction, Modern Method of Construction (MMC)  and Off-site Construction. CIDB Malaysia, through CIDB IBS SDN BHD is promoting the usage of IBS to increase productivity and quality at construction sites  through various promotion programmes, training and incentives. The content of IBS (IBS Score) is determined based on the Construction Industry Standard 18 (CIS 18: 2010); either manually, web application or fully automated CAD-based IBS Score calculator. For example, its use in the Forest City project.

References

Building engineering